Raymond Sommer (31 August 1906 – 10 September 1950) was a French motor racing driver. He raced both before and after WWII with some success, particularly in endurance racing. Sommer was also competitive at the highest level in Grand Prix motor racing, but did not win a race. He won the French Grand Prix in 1936, but the event that year was run as a sports car race. After racing resumed in the late 1940s, Sommer again won a number of sports car and minor Grand Prix events, and finished in fourth place in the 1950 Monaco Grand Prix, the second round of the newly-instituted Formula One World Drivers' Championship. He was killed toward the end of 1950, when his car overturned during a race at the Circuit de Cadours.

Biography
Sommer was born in Mouzon, in the Ardennes département of France, into a wealthy Sedan carpet-making family. His father, Roger Sommer, broke the Wright Brothers' record for the longest flight in 1909. It was not until 1931 that Raymond started to display daredevil tendencies of his own, entering motor races in a privateer Chrysler Imperial. The following year, he won the 24 Hours of Le Mans race, despite having to drive over 20 hours solo after his teammate, Luigi Chinetti, retired ill. During the 1930s, Sommer was to dominate the French endurance classic, winning again in 1933 driving an Alfa Romeo alongside Tazio Nuvolari. He also led every race until 1938, only to suffer a mechanical failure, once when 12 laps in the lead. Sommer traveled to Long Island, New York, to compete in the 1936 Vanderbilt Cup where he finished fourth behind the winner, Nuvolari.

However, his tendency to run in his own privately entered Alfa Romeos did him no favours on the Grand Prix scene, and although a regular top-10 finisher in Grands Épreuves he never won a race. At the time, the German manufacturers Mercedes-Benz and Auto Union were the dominant force in Grand Prix racing, together with the French Bugatti team. Sommer turned to sports cars once more, and in 1936 he won the French Grand Prix with Jean-Pierre Wimille, and the Spa 24 Hours endurance race with co-driver Francesco Severi. More wins came his way including at the "Marseilles Three Hours" at Miramas, the Grand Prix de Tunisie and La Turbie hill climb competition in 1938 and 1939 with Alfa Romeo 308 until the outbreak of World War II, where he played an active part in the French Resistance movement.

Following the war, Sommer quickly returned to winning ways, claiming victory in the 1946 René Le Bègue Cup race at Saint-Cloud. At the 1947 Turin Grand Prix in Valentino Park he won the first ever Grand Prix for Enzo Ferrari as an independent constructor. The following season, Sommer switched from the Ferrari team, again for a privately owned car, this time a Talbot-Lago. In 1950, the Formula One World Championship began and Sommer drove in two Grand Prix races for Ferrari and three in a privately entered Talbot-Lago, retiring in all but one.

In July 1950 he won the Aix les Bains Circuit du Lac Grand Prix with a Ferrari 166.

In September 1950, he entered the Haute-Garonne Grand Prix in Cadours, France, where the steering failed on his 1100 cc Cooper and the car overturned at a corner. Sommer, wearing his traditional canvas helmet, was instantly killed.

Major career wins
French Grand Prix 1936
Grand Prix de Marseilles 1932, 1937, 1946
Grand Prix de Tunisie 1937
Grand Prix de L'U.M.F. 1935
Gran Premio del Valentino 1947
Madrid Grand Prix 1949
Spa 24 Hours  1936
Turin Grand Prix 1947
24 Hours of Le Mans 1932, 1933

Racing record

Complete 24 Hours of Le Mans results

Complete European Championship results
(key) (Races in bold indicate pole position) (Races in italics indicate fastest lap)

Post WWII Grandes Épreuves results
(key) (Races in bold indicate pole position; races in italics indicate fastest lap)

Complete Formula One World Championship results
(key) (Races in bold indicate pole position) (Races in italics indicate fastest lap)

Complete Formula One Non-Championship results
(key) (Races in bold indicate pole position)(Races in italics indicate fastest lap)

References

External links

Raymond Sommer profile at Grand Prix encyclopedia

1906 births
1950 deaths
Sportspeople from Ardennes (department)
French Formula One drivers
Ferrari Formula One drivers
Talbot Formula One drivers
Racing drivers who died while racing
Grand Prix drivers
French Resistance members
French racing drivers
24 Hours of Le Mans drivers
24 Hours of Le Mans winning drivers
24 Hours of Spa drivers
Sport deaths in France
European Championship drivers